Prince Kollie (born March 1, 2003) is an American football linebacker for the Notre Dame Fighting Irish.

High school career 
Kollie attended David Crockett High School in Jonesborough, Tennessee. Kollie recorded over 100 tackles in his senior season and won the Butkus award. He was a four star recruit coming out of high school and committed to play at the University of Notre Dame on August 7, 2020.

College career
Kollie began his Notre Dame career in 2021.

Statistics

References

External links
Notre Dame Fighting Irish bio

Living people
Notre Dame Fighting Irish football players
American football linebackers
Players of American football from Tennessee
2003 births